City of My Dreams is a 1960 novel by the Swedish writer Per Anders Fogelström. The narrative follows a group of working-class people on Södermalm in Stockholm between 1860 and 1880. It was the first novel in a series of five. It was adapted into a 1976 film with the same title, directed by Ingvar Skogsberg.

See also
 1960 in literature
 Swedish literature

References

1960 Swedish novels
Novels set in Stockholm
Albert Bonniers Förlag books
Swedish-language novels
Family saga novels